Members of the New South Wales Legislative Council who served from 1898 to 1901 were appointed for life by the Governor on the advice of the Premier. This list includes members between the election on 27 July 1898 and the election on 3 July 1901. The President was Sir John Lackey.

Non-Labor party affiliations at this time were fluid, and especially in the Legislative Council regarded more as loose labels than genuine parties.

See also
Reid ministry
Lyne ministry

Notes

References

 

Members of New South Wales parliaments by term
20th-century Australian politicians